This article lists the performances of each of the 5 national teams which have made at least one appearance in the European Wheelchair Handball Nations' Tournament finals.

Debut of teams
Each successive European Men's Handball Championship has had at least one team appearing for the first time. Teams in parentheses are considered successor teams by IHF.

Participation details
;Legend
 – Champions
 – Runners-up
 – Third place
 – Fourth place
 – Did not enter
 – Hosts

For each tournament, the number of teams in each finals tournament (in brackets) are shown.

Results of host nations

Results of defending champions

References

European Wheelchair Handball Nations’ Tournament